Edward Woolnough (5 July 1793 – 27 November 1867) was Archdeacon of Chester from July 1865 until his death.

Woolnough was born at Boyton, Suffolk and educated at Christ's College, Cambridge.  He was at Whitton from 1821 until 1849; and Northenden from 1849.

References

1793 births
People from Suffolk Coastal (district)
Alumni of Christ's College, Cambridge
Archdeacons of Chester
1866 deaths
Clergy from Ipswich